Luc Reydams is a scholar of political science and international law who teaches at University of Notre Dame.

Works

References

Living people
Year of birth missing (living people)
University of Notre Dame faculty